S58 may refer to:
 S58 (Long Island bus)
 Blériot-SPAD S.58, a French racing biplane
 BMW S58, an automobile engine
 , a submarine of the Indian Navy
 Shanghai–Changzhou Expressway
 SIAI S.58, a prototype Italian flying boat
 Sikorsky S-58, an American helicopter